1896 was the seventh season of County Championship cricket in England. Yorkshire won the championship title having lost only losing three of their 26 matches, setting a points percentage record with 68.42. Yorkshire's team did not possess the greatest performers statistically, such as Sussex with Ranjitsinhji, or Gloucestershire with W. G. Grace, but a well-rounded squad with four bowlers taking more than 70 wickets in the Championship and five batsmen scoring over 1000 runs gave them the title. Playing against Warwickshire at Edgbaston in May, Yorkshire scored 887 in their first innings, which is still the highest total in the history of the County Championship.

The highlight of the season, however, was the Australian tour, where Australia won their first Test match in England since 1888, and gave England a fight up until the third Test. On a rain-affected pitch, however, England hauled in a 66-run third test victory thanks to Bobby Peel, who took six for 23. The win sealed the Ashes in favour of England by 2 wins to 1.

Honours
County Championship - Yorkshire
Minor Counties Championship - Worcestershire
Wisden (Five Cricketers of the Season) - Syd Gregory, Dick Lilley, K S Ranjitsinhji, Tom Richardson, Hugh Trumble)

County Championship

Final table 

 1 Games completed

Points system:

 1 for a win
 0 for a draw, a tie or an abandoned match
 -1 for a loss
 Total points were then divided by the number of games completed, which determined the ranking

Most runs in the County Championship

Most wickets in the County Championship

Ashes tour 

England won again, but this time faced a series-decider in the final match at The Oval, without George Lohmann of Surrey and William Gunn of Nottinghamshire, who went on a strike over match fees allegedly received by the amateur WG Grace. In the first Test at Lord's, England won by six wickets, chasing 108 to win, but Australia recovered to win the second Test at Old Trafford, despite 154 from Ranjitsinhji on debut - as the first Indian to play Test cricket, and only the second to score a century on Test debut. The third Test was ravaged by rain, and in poor playing conditions England won by 66 runs. The highest individual score in that match was 47 from Australian Joe Darling.

Overall first-class statistics

Leading batsmen

Leading bowlers

Annual reviews
 James Lillywhite's Cricketers' Annual (Red Lilly), Lillywhite, 1897
 Wisden Cricketers' Almanack 1897

References

External links
 Cricket in England in 1896

1896 in English cricket
1896